Thomas Andrew Compton (born May 10, 1989) is an American football offensive tackle for the National Football League (NFL). He played college football at South Dakota and was drafted by the Washington Redskins in the sixth round of the 2012 NFL Draft. Compton has also played for the Atlanta Falcons, Chicago Bears, Minnesota Vikings, New York Jets, and San Francisco 49ers.

Early life
A native of the suburb Rosemount, Minnesota, Compton attended Rosemount High School, where he was a two-year starter on the offensive line and led the team to the section championship and state semifinals.

College career
At the University of South Dakota, Compton was a three-time Great West Conference selection—honorable mention in 2009 and consecutive first team selections in 2010, 2011—and 2011 GWC Offensive Lineman of the Year. After his senior season, he played at the 2012 East–West Shrine Game.

Professional career

Compton was invited to the 2012 NFL Combine, where he was listed as the No. 9 offensive guard prospect. Projected as a fourth round selection by Sports Illustrated, Compton was ranked as the No. 8 offensive guard available in the 2012 NFL Draft.

Washington Redskins

Compton was drafted in the sixth round of 2012 NFL Draft by the Washington Redskins. He was the first South Dakota Coyote drafted since Chul Schwanke in 1986. He was officially signed by the Redskins to a four-year contract on May 6, 2012. Compton was cut on August 31, 2012 for final cuts before the start of the 2012 season. After not being claimed off waivers, he was signed to the team's practice squad the next day.

On December 5, 2012, it was announced that Compton had been promoted to the Redskins 53-man roster after the Redskins placed cornerback Cedric Griffin on the suspended list. He became the starting right tackle midway through the 2014 season, after the incumbent Tyler Polumbus was benched following poor performance.
 
The Redskins re-signed Compton on February 27, 2015.

Atlanta Falcons
Compton signed with the Atlanta Falcons on March 15, 2016.

In the 2016 season, Compton and the Falcons reached Super Bowl LI, where they faced the New England Patriots on February 5, 2017. In the Super Bowl, the Falcons lost 28-34 in overtime, despite having a 25-point lead.

Chicago Bears
Compton signed with the Chicago Bears on March 11, 2017.

Minnesota Vikings
On March 22, 2018, Compton signed with the Minnesota Vikings, re-uniting with Kirk Cousins. He started 14 games at left guard, missing two with a knee injury.

New York Jets

On March 18, 2019, Compton signed with the New York Jets. After beginning the season as a backup, Compton was named the starting right guard in Week 11 following an injury to Brian Winters. He started five games before being placed on injured reserve on December 28, 2019.

San Francisco 49ers
On April 3, 2020, Compton signed a one-year contract with the San Francisco 49ers. The signing reunited Compton with San Francisco 49ers’ head coach Kyle Shanahan, who previously was the offensive coordinator with the Washington Redskins and Atlanta Falcons. He was placed on injured reserve on December 12, 2020. He was activated on January 2, 2021.

Compton re-signed with the 49ers on a one-year contract on April 28, 2021.

Denver Broncos
On March 17, 2022, Compton signed a one-year contract with the Denver Broncos. He was placed on the reserve/PUP list to start the season on August 23, 2022. He was activated on November 15. He was placed on injured reserve on December 22.

Personal life
Compton played a reporter in the 2015 movie Sharknado 3: Oh Hell No!.

Compton is the cousin of fellow NFL player, Will Compton.

References

External links

 
 Washington Redskins bio
 South Dakota Coyotes bio

1989 births
Living people
People from Rosemount, Minnesota
Players of American football from Minnesota
Sportspeople from the Minneapolis–Saint Paul metropolitan area
American football offensive tackles
South Dakota Coyotes football players
Washington Redskins players
Atlanta Falcons players
Chicago Bears players
Minnesota Vikings players
New York Jets players
San Francisco 49ers players
Denver Broncos players